Utricularia laciniata is a small, probably annual, carnivorous plant that belongs to the genus Utricularia. U. laciniata is endemic to Brazil, where it is only known from Goiás and Minas Gerais. It flowers between January and May in its native range. U. laciniata was originally described and published by Augustin Saint-Hilaire and Frédéric de Girard in 1838.

See also 
 List of Utricularia species

References 

Carnivorous plants of South America
Flora of Brazil
laciniata